At least two ships of the Hellenic Navy have borne the name Velos ("Arrow"):

  a  launched in 1907 and stricken in 1926.
  a  launched in 1942 as USS Charrette she was transferred to Greece in 1959 and renamed. She was stricken in 1991 and became a museum ship.

Hellenic Navy ship names